Luxury Briefing is a magazine that was launched in 1996 by James Ogilvy. The magazine is published by the Luxury Business Group on a monthly basis and is based in London. It is a subscription-only publication and has to do with luxury goods such as cars and clothes. The magazine confers an Award for Excellence each year. 

In 2011 the magazine started a quarterly supplement, Luxury Connections.

Award for Excellence
2005 Aston Martin
2003 Bentley Motors
1998 Tanne Krolle

References

External links
Luxury Briefing

Lifestyle magazines published in the United Kingdom
Monthly magazines published in the United Kingdom
Magazines published in London
Magazines established in 1996